Kopylovo is a rural locality (a settlement) in Vostrovskoye Rural Settlement, Nyuksensky District, Vologda Oblast, Russia. The population was 277 as of 2002. There are 11 streets.

Geography 
Kopylovo is located 77 km northeast of Nyuksenitsa (the district's administrative centre) by road. Strelka is the nearest rural locality.

References 

Rural localities in Nyuksensky District